The 2017 Ohio Valley Conference women's basketball tournament was held March 1–4 at Nashville Municipal Auditorium in Nashville, Tennessee.

Format
The OVC women's tournament is a traditional single-elimination eight-team tournament, seeded with the #8 seed facing the #1 seed in the first round, #7 facing #2, and so on. There is no reseeding, so if the #8 team were to defeat the #1 seed it would continue in the tournament playing the team which would have faced the #1 seed in the subsequent round (winner of #4 vs. #5).

Seeds

Bracket

See also
2017 Ohio Valley Conference men's basketball tournament

References

External links
2017 OVC Men's & Women's Basketball Championship

Ohio Valley Conference women's basketball tournament
Basketball competitions in Nashville, Tennessee
Women's sports in Tennessee
College sports tournaments in Tennessee
2016–17 Ohio Valley Conference women's basketball season